Karrat Island is an island of Greenland. It is located in Baffin Bay in the Upernavik Archipelago. It was once a prime walrus hunting ground for the Oqonermiut (Those who live on the Leeside).

References

Islands of the Upernavik Archipelago